Técheöd is the fourth studio album by drone rock band Pelt. It was released on April 1, 1998, through VHF Records.

Track listing

Personnel 
Pelt
Patrick Best – instruments, photography
Mike Gangloff – vocals, instruments, photography
Jack Rose – instruments
Production and additional personnel
Mark Cornick – percussion on "New Delhi Blues"
Bill Kellum – recording on "Big Walker Mountain Tunnel"
Amy Shea – fiddle on "New Delhi Blues", photography
Mick Simmons – tabla on "New Delhi Blues"

References 

1998 albums
Pelt (band) albums
VHF Records albums